The Real Book is a musicians' fake book – a compilation of lead sheets for jazz standards.  Fake books had been around at least since the late 1920s, but their organization was haphazard, and their content did not always keep pace with contemporary musical styles.  The Real Book was initially produced by two students at the Berklee College of Music in the 1970s, as an updated fake book.  It became so popular that the book was eventually "legitimized" by publisher Hal Leonard, and re-released in a series of editions and transpositions for various instruments.

Background 
For years, musicians had been producing "lead sheets", so called because they contained only rough outlines of music pieces rather than fully notated scores.  These lead sheets were collected together in volumes and sold to other musicians. These books gave the musician enough basic information – melody, chord symbols, structure, lyrics – to "fake" their way through the tune, that is, to perform a credible version of a tune that they might not be familiar with, and for which they lacked a full score. Hence these collections became known as "fake books".

Early fake books were mainly used by professional bands who performed mostly standards, often more geared to society and dance bands rather than jazz ensembles, and devoted much space to show tunes, novelty tunes, traditional jazz, etc. The first three Real Book volumes, in contrast, contained many bebop and other jazz standards that were likely to be encountered on jazz gigs at the time. For this reason, the books were quickly adopted among jazz players in the 1970s, particularly on the East Coast of the United States.

The original Real Book volumes, like earlier fake books, were printed without securing copyright releases or paying royalties, and they were thus illegal. These unlicensed books were all sold through informal connections, such as for cash in the backs of music stores, and between musicians. In 2004, the Real Book material was acquired by the publisher Hal Leonard and licensed for legal sale. Many new volumes were eventually added to the series, and some of the errors in the original volumes were corrected. These books also inspired a similar series, offered by the Sher Music Co., called The New Real Book.

The Real Book is published in editions to suit both transposing (B, E, F) and non-transposing (C) instruments, as well as bass clef and voice editions ("low" and "high" voice, with lyrics). Each edition is identically paginated.

History
Compositions by Steve Swallow, Paul Bley, and Chick Corea are heavily represented in The Real Book with jazz standards and classic jazz compositions. Those were the songs that were played most in Boston in the early 1970s when the book was written. When Swallow was asked about the origin in February 2018, he said the book was written by students at Berklee who wanted to make money. They asked permission to use some of his songs, and he agreed. Swallow asked Bley and Steve Kuhn if they wanted some of their songs included, and they did; so they all contributed lead sheets. Swallow helped briefly with editing.

Then I watched these guys finally get the book together. One of them had a beautiful manuscript that subsequently became classic—it's called the Real Book font, and it imitates with uncanny accuracy his hand. He went on to be a big-time music copyist in Hollywood... The irony is that shortly after the book was put out, some other people realized they could photocopy it and sell it themselves, and the two guys who did all the work and put the book together made a lot less money than they had hoped to because there were imitation Real Books out there almost immediately... The Real Book was imperfect; there were wrong changes throughout it, but it was tremendously more accurate than what existed previously. And also, it was a lot more legible; it was easy to read."

Only the first volume is the original. The two following volumes of The Real Book were produced. Volume 2 is printed in characteristically "rough" handwriting and transcription, while the third volume is typeset on a computer. The transcriptions in The Real Book are unlicensed; no royalties are paid to the musicians whose songs appear in the book. Consequently, the book violates copyright and is therefore illegal. In the past, it was usually sold surreptitiously in local music stores, often hidden behind the counter for customers who asked. PDF editions of the book are often available illegally on P2P networks.

The name is a play on words from the common name for these types of song folios: "fake book", though it might have been influenced by the Boston alternative weekly newspaper, The Real Paper, started by writers of The Phoenix newspaper in Boston after a labor dispute.

A variety of dates have been attributed to the book. The April 1990 issue of Esquire featured The Real Book in the "Man at His Best" column by Mark Roman in an article called "Clef Notes". He stated, "I don't know a jazzman who hasn't owned, borrowed, or Xeroxed pages from a Real Book at least once in his career," and he quoted John F. Voigt, music librarian at Berklee. "The Real Book came out around 1971. The only material available in print then was crap."

Another feature surfaced on April 10, 1994, in The New York Times article "Flying Below the Radar of Copyrights". Guitarist Bill Wurtzel was quoted as saying, "Everyone has one, but no one knows where they come from." The writer of the article, Michael Lydon, said, "I got mine in 1987 from a bassist who lives in Queens and who attended the Berklee School of Music in Boston; many in jazz circles suspect that students there reproduced the first copies of it in the mid-70s."

Pat Metheny claims that while teaching at Berklee College of Music from 1973 to 1974, one of his guitar students and one of Gary Burton's vibraphone students (both of whom wish to remain anonymous) invented the idea of assembling the anthology that would form The Real Book. Early editions included several compositions by Metheny as "Untitled Tune" as they had not yet been recorded and released.

Hal Leonard 
In 2004, the music publisher Hal Leonard obtained the rights to most of the tunes contained in the original Real Book and published the first legal edition, calling it the Real Book Sixth Edition in tacit acknowledgment of the five previous illegal versions. The cover and binding are identical to the "old" Real Book, and the books employ a font similar to the handwritten style of the originals. One hundred and thirty-seven tunes were omitted from the 6th edition that were in the 5th, and 90 new tunes were added.

Hal Leonard released The Real Book, Volume II, Second Edition in answer to the Real Book, Volume II. This was followed by The Real Book, Volume III, Second Edition (July 2006), The Real Book, Volume IV (December 2010), The Real Book, Volume V  (June 2013), and The Real Book, Volume VI (June 2016). These books contain much of the same material as their counterparts, and in most cases charts from Hal Leonard books are compatible with the Real Book charts. In some cases, compatibility issues occur where corrections have been made to some of the mistakes in the 5th edition charts; in other cases, 6th edition charts reference changes on different recordings from those cited in the previous edition.

Selected editions 

Note: The New Real Book, also in 3 volumes, published by Sher Music Co., is another legal and readily available modern alternative. The collection of tunes in it differs from the original Real Book. This edition offers some of the same songs, with different transcriptions and notation.

Some other music publishers also apply the term Real Book to their own publications — for example, the Associated Board of the Royal Schools of Music publishes The AB Real Book. Alfred Publishing Co. has three Real Books.

See also
 Ralph Patt, author of The Vanilla Book of 400 chord progressions for jazz standards
 Chas. H. Hansen Music Corp., pioneer publisher of legitimate fake books

References

External links
 99% Invisible podcast episode on the Berklee book from the 1970s

Song books

sv:Fakebook#The Real Book